Cyclopteris is an extinct genus of seed ferns in the extinct family †Cyclopteridaceae. Species are from the Carboniferous.

 Cyclopteris elegans Lesquereux, 1854 - from the Carboniferous of Pennsylvania, USA
 Cyclopteris elegans Unger, 1858
 Cyclopteris elegans Achepohl, 1883 - from Westphalia, Germany

References

External links 

 
 
 

Pteridospermatophyta
Prehistoric plant genera
Paleozoic life of New Brunswick
Paleozoic life of Nova Scotia
Paleozoic life of Quebec
Prehistoric plants of North America